The Treaty of Valençay (8 December 1813), after the château of the same name belonging to former French foreign minister Charles Maurice de Talleyrand, was drafted by Antoine René Mathurin and José Miguel de Carvajal y Manrique on behalf of the French Empire and the Spanish Crown respectively.

Napoleon Bonaparte, realizing that France was defeated in the Peninsular War and wishing to reestablish an alliance with Spain, intended the Treaty as the preliminary to a full peace treaty between France and Spain. The agreement provided for the withdrawal of French troops from Spain, and the restoration of Ferdinand VII of Spain, imprisoned at Valençay since 1808, to the Spanish throne usurped by Joseph Bonaparte.

Included in the terms was an armistice which neither side, mistrusting the other's intentions, fully intended to respect. It appears Napoleon also extracted an oath from Ferdinand in a secret protocol which required the Spanish monarch to turn the Spanish Army against the British and Portuguese should Wellington continue to use Spain as a base of operations against France. In any event, the Cortes of Cádiz duly repudiated the treaty once Ferdinand had reached the safety of Madrid. The Peninsular War would continue until Napoleon's defeat in France by the powers of the Sixth Coalition.

See also
 List of treaties

References

Bibliography
Gates, David (2001). The Spanish Ulcer: A History of the Peninsular War. Da Capo Press. 
Longford, Elizabeth (1969). Wellington: The Years of The Sword. New York: Harper and Row Publishers

Peninsular War
1813 in France
1813 in Spain
Legal history of France
Valençay
Valençay
Valençay
Valençay
France–Spain relations
December 1813 events